F16, F 16, F-16 or FI6 may refer to:
 General Dynamics F-16 Fighting Falcon, a 1974 American multirole fighter jet aircraft
 FI6 (antibody), an antibody that targets influenza A viruses
 F 16 Uppsala, a Swedish air force base
 Formula 16, a 5-metre catamaran
 Volvo F16, a truck
 Half-precision floating-point format, a 16-bit computer number format
 Shibuya Station, a railway station in Tokyo, coded as F16 on the Fukutoshin Line
 Fluorine-16 (F-16 or 16F), an isotope of fluorine

See also
 F-16 Rachanon (born 1991), Thai kickboxer